The People Dem is reggae, dancehall artist Capleton's twelfth studio album. 
It was released on November 23, 2004. The album features guest appearances from Military Man.

Track listing

	

2004 albums
Capleton albums